Damiano Vannucci (born 30 July 1977 in San Marino) is a retired San Marinese footballer who played as a midfielder. He had been capped a then-record 68 times for the San Marino national team, beating Mirco Gennari's record of 48, but was surpassed by Andy Selva in 2015.

References

1977 births
Living people
Sammarinese footballers
San Marino international footballers
A.C. Libertas players
S.S. Virtus players
A.C. Juvenes/Dogana players
S.P. La Fiorita players
Association football midfielders